Curitiba Brazil Temple is the 126th dedicated temple in operation of the Church of Jesus Christ of Latter-day Saints (LDS Church).

History
It was dedicated June 1, 2008 by LDS Church president Thomas S. Monson. Located in Curitiba, the capital of Paraná state, it became the fifth LDS Church temple in Brazil.

The history of the Church in Curitiba goes back to April 22, 1938, at a meeting held that day there were only four people and a few missionaries. In 1939, James E. Faust labored as a young missionary in Curitiba.

The plans to build a temple in Curitiba were announced by the LDS Church on 23 August 2002. Ground was broken and the site was dedicated on 10 March 2005 by Russell M. Nelson of the Quorum of the Twelve Apostles. The temple serves Latter-day Saints in 29 stakes in the states of Paraná and Santa Catarina. As of 2019, Getulio W. Silva is the temple president.

In 2020, like all the church's other temples, the Curitiba Brazil Temple was closed temporarily during the year in response to the coronavirus pandemic.

See also

 Comparison of temples of The Church of Jesus Christ of Latter-day Saints
 List of temples of The Church of Jesus Christ of Latter-day Saints
 List of temples of The Church of Jesus Christ of Latter-day Saints by geographic region
 Temple architecture (Latter-day Saints)
 The Church of Jesus Christ of Latter-day Saints in Brazil

References

External links
 
 Curitiba Brazil Temple Official site
 Curitiba Brazil Temple at ChurchofJesusChristTemples.org

21st-century Latter Day Saint temples
Religious buildings and structures in Paraná (state)
Buildings and structures in Curitiba
Religious buildings and structures completed in 2008
Temples (LDS Church) in Brazil
2008 establishments in Brazil